The Weighted Companion Cube (also simply called the Companion Cube) is a fictional item featured in the Portal series of video games by Valve Corporation. Initially featured in a single level of the original Portal, Test Chamber 17, as one of Aperture Science's ubiquitous Weighted Storage Cubes with heart symbols printed on the outside, it is given to the game's main character, Chell, as part of the antagonist GLaDOS's sinister testing initiative. After carrying it through the entire level and ostensibly anthropomorphizing and "bonding" with the Cube, the malevolent AI forces her to unceremoniously dispose of it in an incinerator device. Companion Cubes later re-appear in the game's sequel with a slightly different design. The original Companion Cube is shown to have survived the events of both Portal and Portal 2, appearing as part of an ending gag.

While GLaDOS has suggested the Companion Cube may be sentient, it is unclear whether this was solely to psychologically torment Chell. However, in the comic Portal 2: Lab Rat, Doug Rattman's Companion Cube is shown speaking to him, possibly as part of a schizophrenic hallucination.

Following the game's release, the Weighted Companion Cube quickly increased in popularity among fans, spawning a wide array of official merchandise and fan works. It has since become a mascot for Valve's games, and has also been referenced in other, unrelated games as Easter eggs.

Development 
The Companion Cube was initially conceived as part of the gameplay of Test Chamber 17, due to players constantly forgetting to bring the crate along with them. Making the Weighted Companion Cube visually distinct and stating it as being so informed the player that it was of importance and was to be used and reused for the duration of the Test Chamber. The Cube was made to appear "vulnerable" rather than ubiquitous through GLaDOS's dialog, conditioning players to feel responsible for its well-being and want to take it along.

In early versions of the game, the player was forced to simply abandon it and move on. However, the developers were seeking a way to make the player familiar with how Aperture Science's incinerators worked in order to use them to destroy the personality cores in the final battle against GLaDOS. They hit upon the idea to have GLaDOS force Chell to destroy the Cube in the incinerator, believing the idea to be a "perfect thing" and "way stronger" emotionally, and attributing its success to "design arguments" between members of the development team.

Merchandise 
Some of the first official Companion Cube merchandise released by Valve in 2007 included a plushie and fuzzy dice.

In 2015, the Companion Cube was featured in a LEGO Dimensions Portal 2 pack, in 2017, a Companion Cube skin was added to Dota 2 for the character Io, and in 2020, the Steam version of Apex Legends added charms that included the Companion Cube being hugged by the character Wattson.

Reception 
The Companion Cube has been cited as an example of experimental science's "sacrificial logic". Respawn: Gamers, Hackers, and Technogenic Life compares the fact that it must be "euthanized" for the sake of progress to real-world animal testing, especially because GLaDOS implies that it may or may not be sentient. GLaDOS claims that "an independent panel of ethicists" have absolved Aperture Science or its test subjects from "moral responsibility" for the death of the Companion Cube, but continues to obscure whether or not it can feel any pain, suggesting that only "eight out of ten" engineers agree that it "cannot feel much", much like the debate over pain in animals when used in scientific and medical research.

The Companion Cube has also been shown to demonstrate how fans are willing to go outside the bounds of the game's logic in order to "rescue" the Cube, a form of resistance that is similar to hacktivism and culture jamming. Kim Swift, head designer of Portal, noted that many players were willing to do almost anything to save the Companion Cube, including jumping into the incinerator themselves. Others attempted to exploit or glitch the game in order to escape the test chamber with the Cube, such as jamming the doors with security cameras so that the player could leave the room despite not having incinerated it. This places players entirely into the role of Chell, with both player and Chell trying to escape a situation that is "algorithmically controlled" by GLaDOS. The desire to save the Cube also manifested in the many fan created works based on it, which "liberate" it from the game itself.

The Cube has been called an "object of desire", as it is purposely described by GLaDOS using the language of affection. While the relationship between the player and Cube appears to be platonic at first, the romantic and sexual implications are shown shortly after the player obtains the Cube as they can find a wall of graffiti depicting human figures with their heads replaced by Companion Cubes, including a nearly naked human-object hybrid pin-up wearing a red bra and matching underwear.

Matt Margini of Kill Screen compared the Companion Cube to other video game sidekicks that must be escorted through levels, calling it both an object of "annoyance" as well as "disproportionate emotional investment". Johnathan Neuls of Ars Technica praised the Companion Cube as "probably the strongest inside joke to come out of a game since 'All your base'".

World of Warcraft featured an Easter egg based on the Companion Cube outside of Stormwind, during the game's 2008 "Love is in the Air" Valentine's Day festivities. Fan Magnus Persson created a fully functioning Companion Cube PC, which Wired called "a triumph" in reference to "Still Alive". Another fan, Stephen Granade, turned a Rubik's Cube into a Companion Cube, albeit noting that it was "always solved".

References 

Portal characters
Fictional cubes
Fictional elements introduced in 2007
Internet memes introduced in 2007
Non-human characters in video games
Video game characters introduced in 2007
Video game objects
Video game mascots